Live at Maybeck Recital Hall, Volume Fifteen is a 1992 live album by jazz pianist Buddy Montgomery, recorded at the Maybeck Recital Hall in Berkeley, California.

Reception

The album was positively reviewed by Richard S. Ginell at Allmusic who wrote that Montgomery "has more than enough of the solid musicianship and abundant technique that seems to go with the territory in this series", though Ginell felt that Montgomery's "solo ruminations, however accomplished, aren't all that compelling here". Ginell highlighted "Who Cares" and "Money Blues" as stand out tracks.

Track listing 
 "Since I Fell for You" (Buddy Johnson) – 5:25 
 "A Cottage for Sale" (Larry Conley, Willard Robison) – 5:19
 "Who Cares?" (George Gershwin, Ira Gershwin) – 5:23  
 "The Night Has a Thousand Eyes" (Buddy Bernier, Jerry Brainin) – 3:35 
 "What'll I Do" (Irving Berlin) – 4:49  
 "You've Changed" (Bill Carey, Carl T. Fischer) – 5:45 
 "Money Blues" (G.C. Coleman, Harry Eller, Dave Leader) – 5:59  
 "This Time I'll Be Sweeter" (Haras Fyre, Gwen Guthrie) – 5:45  
 "Soft Winds" (Benny Goodman) – 4:04
 "My Lord and Master"/"Something Wonderful" (Oscar Hammerstein II, Richard Rodgers) – 6:52
 "The Man I Love" (G. Gershwin, I. Gershwin) – 3:54
 "How to Handle a Woman" (Frederick Loewe, Alan Jay Lerner) – 4:52
 "By Myself" (Howard Dietz, Arthur Schwartz) – 5:00

Personnel 
 Buddy Montgomery – piano
 Kent Judkins - art direction
 Barbara Fisher - assistant engineer
 John Burk - assistant producer
 David Luke - engineer
 Derek Richardson - liner notes
 George Horn - mastering
 James Gudeman - photography
 Carl Jefferson - producer

References

1992 live albums
Buddy Montgomery live albums
Concord Records live albums
Albums produced by Carl Jefferson
Albums recorded at the Maybeck Recital Hall
Solo piano jazz albums